This is a chronological list of ship commissionings occurring in 1906.

See also

References 

1906